Reginald Irenee Vachon (January 29, 1937 – December 24, 2020) was an American mechanical engineer, business executive, lawyer and inventor, known as former president of the American Society of Mechanical Engineers.

Biography

Youth, education and early career 
Vachon was born in Norfolk, Virginia, son of Rene Albert Vachon and  Regina (Galvin) Radcliffe Vachon. After his high school graduation in 1954, he attended the United States Naval Academy in 1954-55. He continued his studies at  Auburn University, where he obtained his BSc in mechanical engineering in 1958, and his MSc in nuclear science in 1960.

Vachon further continued his studies at  Oklahoma State University, where he obtain his Ph.D. in mechanical engineering in 1963. In 1969 he would also obtained his Bachelor of Laws at the Thomas Goode Jones School of Law. In the meantime Vachon had started his academic career at  Auburn University in 1958 as a research assistant, became a research associate in 1963, and was associate professor from 1963 to 1978.

Further career 
In 1977, Vachon founded Vachon Nix & Associates, where he is president ever since. From 1981 to 1990 he worked as chief operating officer at the Thacker Construction Company. In 1991-92 he was President and CEO of Compris Technology, Inc., and has served as an executive in some other companies ever since, including United Information Technologies, Inc. and Direct Measurements, Inc.

Honours and awards 
He was President of the American Society of Mechanical Engineers International in 2003-2004.

He was awarded the 2019 ASME Medal by the American Society of Mechanical Engineers.

Selected publications 
Articles, a selection
 Fong, J. T., Ranson, W. F., Vachon, R. I., & Marcal, P. V. (2008, January). Structural Aging Monitoring via Web-Based Nondestructive Evaluation (NDE) Technology. In ASME 2008 Pressure Vessels and Piping Conference (pp. 1565-1613). American Society of Mechanical Engineers.

Patents, a selection
 Vachon, Reginald I. "Apparatus and method for determining stress and strain in pipes, pressure vessels, structural members and other deformable bodies." U.S. Patent No. 4,591,996. 27 May 1986.
 Vachon, Reginald I., and William F. Ranson. "Apparatus and method for determining the stress and strain in pipes, pressure vessels, structural members and other deformable bodies." U.S. Patent No. 5,065,331. 12 Nov. 1991.
 Vachon, Reginald I. "Finite element analysis fatigue gage." U.S. Patent No. 6,874,370. 5 Apr. 2005.

References

External links 
 Dr. Reginald Vachon at wfeo.org, 2008-17.

1937 births
Living people
American mechanical engineers
American lawyers
American business executives
United States Naval Academy alumni
Auburn University alumni
Oklahoma State University alumni
Thomas Goode Jones School of Law alumni
Auburn University faculty
People from Norfolk, Virginia
Presidents of the American Society of Mechanical Engineers
Engineers from Virginia